Elain Harwood (born June 1958) is an architectural historian with  Historic England and a specialist in post-Second World War English architecture.

Early life
Born in June 1958 in Beeston, Nottinghamshire, she attended Bramcote Hills Grammar School before reading history at Bristol University. It was the derelict terraces and docklands of Bristol that first drew Harwood to Bristol, but the city was also the home of Berthold Lubetkin and it was an exhibition of his work and the Thirties exhibition at the Hayward Gallery in 1979 that kindled an interest in modernism, and the modern buildings of her childhood – schools and the Nottingham Playhouse – that had been so influential to her education, having come from a modest background.

Career
Looking for a career, she took a temporary job in January 1984 at what was to become English Heritage, and has stayed there ever since, learning most from an inspiring day release course in Building Conservation at the Architectural Association.  In 1987 she joined what had been the Greater London Council Historic Buildings Division, by then absorbed into English Heritage, just as research was needed on post-war buildings, and between 1996 and 2004 was responsible for most of the organisation's recommendations for listing buildings from the period after 1945, as well as for research programmes on earlier cinemas and flats.  She completed a PhD on the building of London's South Bank at Bristol University in 2010.

Her substantial review of postwar English architecture, Space, Hope and Brutalism, won the 2016 Alice Davis Hitchcock prize of the Society of Architectural Historians of Great Britain.

Selected publications

1990s
 (with Andrew Saint)
Tayler and Green, Architects 1938–1973: The Spirit of Place in Modern Housing. The Prince of Wales's Institute of Architecture, London 1998. (with Alan Powers)

2000s
Festival of Britain. 2001. (With Alan Powers) (Twentieth Century Architecture)
England: A Guide to Post-war Listed Buildings Historic England, London 2003.
The Heroic Period of Conservation. 2006. (With Alan Powers) (Twentieth Century Architecture)
The Sixties: Life, Style, Architecture. 2006. (With Alan Powers)
Housing the Twentieth Century Nation. 2008. (With Alan Powers)
Nottingham: City Guide. 2008. (Pevsner Architectural Guides: City Guides)

2010s
England's Schools: History, Architecture and Adaptation. 2010. (Informed Conservation)
Chamberlin, Powell and Bon (in the 20th Century Architects series). RIBA Enterprises, London 2011, 
Twentieth Century Architecture: Oxford and Cambridge Volume 11. 2013. (with Alan Powers)
England's Post-War Listed Buildings. 2015. (with James O. Davies)
Houses: Regional Practice and Local Character. 2015. (with Alan Powers)
Space, Hope, and Brutalism: English Architecture, 1945–1975. Paul Mellon Centre for Studies in British Art. 2015.
The English Public Library 1945–85: Introductions to Heritage Assets. 2016.
Pomo: Postmodern Buildings in Britain. 2017. (With Geraint Franklin) 
Ernő Goldfinger. 2017. (With Alan Powers) (in the 20th Century Architects series)
Art Deco Britain: Buildings of the Inter-War Years. Pavilion Books, London, 2019

References

External links
http://www.bbc.co.uk/programmes/p03s8w55
https://c20society.org.uk/2015/08/03/c20-historian-elain-harwood-rides-the-london-surrey-100/

1958 births
British architectural historians
Living people